Theodoros "Theo" Angelopoulos (27 April 1935 – 24 January 2012) was a Greek filmmaker, screenwriter and film producer. He dominated the Greek art film industry from 1975 on, and Angelopoulos was one of the most influential and widely respected filmmakers in the world. He started making films in 1967. In the 1970s he made a series of political films about modern Greece.

Angelopoulos' films, described by Martin Scorsese as that of "a masterful filmmaker", are characterized by the slightest movement, slightest change in distance, long takes, and complex, carefully composed scenes. His cinematic method is often described as "sweeping" and "hypnotic."

In 1998 his film Eternity and a Day went on to win the Palme d'Or at the 51st edition of the Cannes Film Festival, and his films have been shown at many of the world's esteemed film festivals.

Biography
Theodoros Angelopoulos was born in Athens on 27 April 1935. His father Spyros hailed from the town of Ampeliona, Messenia in the Peloponnese. During the Greek Civil War, his father was taken hostage and returned when Angelopoulos was 9 years old; according to the director, the absence of his father and looking for him among the dead bodies (during the "Dekemvriana" in Athens) had a great impact on his cinematography. He studied law at the National and Kapodistrian University of Athens, but after his military service went to Paris to attend the Sorbonne. He soon dropped out to study film at the Institut des hautes études cinématographiques (IDHEC) before returning to Greece. There, he worked as a journalist and film critic. Angelopoulos began making films after the 1967 coup that began the Regime of the Colonels. He made his first short film in 1968 and in the 1970s he began making a series of political feature films about modern Greece: Days of '36 (Meres Tou 36, 1972), The Travelling Players (O Thiassos, 1975) and The Hunters (I Kynighoi, 1977). In 1978, he was a member of the jury at the 28th Berlin International Film Festival.

He quickly established a characteristic style, marked by slow, episodic and ambiguous narrative structures as well as long takes (The Travelling Players, for example, consists of only 80 shots in about four hours of film). These takes often include meticulously choreographed and complicated scenes involving many actors.

His regular collaborators include the cinematographer Giorgos Arvanitis, the screenwriter Tonino Guerra and the composer Eleni Karaindrou. One of the recurring themes of his work is immigration, the flight from homeland and the return, as well as the history of 20th century Greece. Angelopoulos was considered by British film critics Derek Malcolm and David Thomson as one of the world's greatest directors.

While critics have speculated on how he developed his style, Angelopoulos made clear in one interview that "The only specific influences I acknowledge are Orson Welles for his use of plan-sequence and deep focus, and Mizoguchi, for his use of time and off-camera space." He had also cited Andrei Tarkovsky's 1979 work Stalker as an influence.

Angelopoulos was awarded honorary doctorates by the Université libre de Bruxelles, Belgium in 1995, by Paris West University Nanterre La Défense, France, by the University of Essex, UK in July 2001, by the University of Western Macedonia, Greece in December 2008, and by the University of the Aegean, Greece in December 2009.

Death 
Angelopoulos died late on Tuesday, 24 January 2012, several hours after being involved in an crash while shooting his latest film, The Other Sea in Athens. On that evening, the filmmaker had been with his crew in the area of Drapetsona, near Piraeus when he was hit by a motorcycle ridden by an off-duty police officer. The crash occurred when Angelopoulos, 76, attempted to cross a busy road. He was taken to hospital, where he was treated in an intensive care unit but succumbed to his serious injuries several hours later. Prior to death he suffered at least one heart attack.

Filmography

Awards
Angelopoulos won numerous awards, including the Palme d'Or at the 51st edition of the Cannes Film Festival in 1998 for Eternity and a Day (Mia aioniotita kai mia mera). His films have been shown at the most important film festivals around the world.

Lifetime achievement awards
Theodoros Angelopoulos was also the recipient of many awards for his long standing career.

Notes

References

Bibliography and sources
Books

 
 
 
 
 
 

Journals, magazines, and web

External links

 
 
 Theo Angelopoulos in musicolog* 

1935 births
2012 deaths
Cannes Film Festival Award for Best Screenplay winners
Directors of Palme d'Or winners
European Film Awards winners (people)
Film people from Athens
Greek expatriates in France
Greek film directors
Greek screenwriters
National and Kapodistrian University of Athens alumni
Road incident deaths in Greece
University of Paris alumni